Benito Justo Fernandez Legarda Jr. (August 6, 1926 – August 26, 2020) was a Filipino historian and economist who became a Deputy Governor of the Bangko Sentral ng Pilipinas.

References 

1926 births
2020 deaths
Economic historians
20th-century Filipino historians
20th-century Filipino economists